Wase may refer to:
WASE - Women against social evil. Anti drug organization led by Mothers only based in Pasighat township of Arunachal Pradesh, India
WASE, an integrated learning course conducted by Wipro Ltd.
Wase language (or Wãpha), a Jukunoid language of Nigeria
Wase, Nigeria, a town and Local Government Area in Plateau State, Nigeria
Wase River
Wase Rock, a massive rocky inselberg
Wase Wind, a Flemish energy cooperative
Christopher Wase (1625?-1690), English scholar, author, translator, and educator